Discocarpus is a genus of the plant family Phyllanthaceae first described as a genus in 1841. It is native to northern South America. It is dioecious, with male and female flowers on separate plants.

Species
 Discocarpus essequeboensis Klotzsch - Brazil (Amazonas, Pará, Amapá), Venezuela (Amazonas), Guyana (Essequibo, Rupununi), Suriname, French Guiana
 Discocarpus gentryi S.M.Hayden - S Venezuela (Amazonas), Peru (Loreto), N Brazil
 Discocarpus pedicellatus Fiaschi & Cordeiro - State of Bahia in Brazil
 Discocarpus spruceanus Müll.Arg. - Venezuela (Amazonas), Brazil (Amazonas, Pará, Mato Grosso), Suriname (Sipaliwini), Bolivia (Santa Cruz)

Formerly included
moved to other genera: Chaetocarpus Lachnostylis 
 Discocarpus duckeanus Jabl. - Chaetocarpus echinocarpus (Baill.) Ducke 
 Discocarpus hirtus (L.f.) Pax & K.Hoffm. - Lachnostylis hirta (L.f.) Müll.Arg.  
 Discocarpus mazarunensis Croizat - Chaetocarpus schomburgkianus (Kuntze) Pax & K.Hoffm.

Names in Urticaceae
In 1851, Liebmann used the same name, Discocarpus, to refer to some plants in the Urticaceae. Thus he created an illegitimate homonym, so his usage of the name had to be abandoned. Species names created in Urticaceae:
 Discocarpus mexicanus Liebm. - Discocnide mexicana (Liebm.) Chew  
 Discocarpus nicaraguensis Liebm. - Discocnide mexicana (Liebm.) Chew

References

Phyllanthaceae genera
Phyllanthaceae
Flora of South America
Taxa named by Johann Friedrich Klotzsch
Dioecious plants